Van Nuys is a neighborhood in the central San Fernando Valley region of Los Angeles, California. Home to Van Nuys Airport and the Valley Municipal Building, it is the most populous neighborhood in the San Fernando Valley.

History

In 1909, the Suburban Homes Company – a syndicate led by Hobart Johnstone Whitley, general manager of the board of control, along with Harry Chandler, H. G. Otis, M. H. Sherman and O. F. Brandt – purchased 48,000 acres of the Farming and Milling Company for $2.5 million. Henry E. Huntington extended his Pacific Electric Railway (Red Cars) through the Valley to Owensmouth (now Canoga Park). The Suburban Home Company laid out plans for roads and the towns of Van Nuys, Reseda (Marian) and Canoga Park (Owensmouth). The rural areas were annexed into the city of Los Angeles in 1915.

The town was founded in 1911 and named for Isaac Newton Van Nuys,of Dutch ancestry, a rancher, entrepreneur and one of its developers. It was annexed by Los Angeles on May 22, 1915, after completion of the Los Angeles Aqueduct, providing it with the water required for further growth. Van Nuys was the first new stop on the San Fernando Line of the Pacific Electric Railway red cars system, which boosted its early land sales and commercial success.  From as far as Alhambra, in 1917, day trips were organized for potential buyers of five-acre farms.

Van Nuys became the Valley's satellite Los Angeles municipal civic center with the 1932 Art Deco Valley Municipal Building (Van Nuys City Hall), a visual landmark and Los Angeles Historic-Cultural Monument, starting the present-day Government Center complex of government services buildings.

In 1991, Marvin Braude, a member of the Los Angeles City Council, redesignated a 45-block area of Van Nuys as a part of Sherman Oaks. This redesignated area included the community of Magnolia Woods. Some area residents had presented a petition and several original deeds that stated "Sherman Oaks" to Braude. They argued that the area was a part of Sherman Oaks until the 1960s, when ZIP Codes labeling the area as Van Nuys were established.

In October 2005, the Metro Orange Line opened with two stations, Van Nuys station (Los Angeles Metro) and Sepulveda station.

In 2014, a "Great Streets" project was introduced by Mayor Eric Garcetti with Van Nuys Blvd. to be redesigned between Victory Blvd. and Oxnard Street. Also, Sepulveda Blvd. was resurfaced between Victory Blvd and Oxnard Street in May 2014. A new Los Angeles County family services building was built on the southwest corner of Van Nuys Blvd. and Saticoy Street in 2016.

Geography and climate
Van Nuys is bordered on the north by North Hills, on the northeast by Panorama City, on the east by Valley Glen, on the south by Sherman Oaks, on the southwest by the Sepulveda Basin, on the west by Lake Balboa, and on the northwest by Northridge. Its street and other boundaries are Roscoe Boulevard on the north, Sepulveda Boulevard, the Tujunga Wash, Woodman Avenue and Hazeltine Avenue on the east, Oxnard Street on the south, the Sepulveda Basin on the southwest and Odessa and Hayvenhurst avenues and Balboa Boulevard on the west.

Boundary changes
Some former Van Nuys neighborhoods won approval in 2009 by the Los Angeles City Council to break off from Van Nuys and join the neighboring communities of Lake Balboa, Valley Glen, and Sherman Oaks in an effort to raise their property values. City Council member Tony Cardenas "suggested the change was motivated by racism."

Climate

Population
The 2000 U.S. census counted 136,443 residents in the 8.99-square-mile Van Nuys neighborhood—or 11,542 people per square mile. In 2000, the median age for residents was 28, considered young for city and county neighborhoods, and the percentages of residents aged 10 or younger and 19 to 34 were among the highest in Los Angeles County.

The neighborhood was considered "moderately diverse" ethnically within Los Angeles. The breakdown was Hispanics, 60.5%; whites, 23.1%; Asians, 6.4%; blacks, 6%; and others, 4%. Mexico (41.5%) and El Salvador (17.3%) were the most common places of birth for the 49.8% of the residents who were born abroad—a high percentage for Los Angeles. There were 4,917 families headed by single parents or 21.3%, considered high for both the city and the county.

The median yearly household income in 2008 dollars was $41,134, considered average for the city, but low for the county. The percentages of households that earned $40,000 or less were high for the county. Renters occupied 73.9% of the housing stock, and house- or apartment-owners held 26.1%.

Economy
Van Nuys Boulevard has a long and diverse commercial district along it, as do other major streets crossing through Van Nuys.

There are two Target stores in Van Nuys, one on Sepulveda and Hatteras and another on Raymer and Kester.

Van Nuys has two Asian supermarkets, one on Sherman Way and White Oak, and one on Sepulveda and Victory.

From December 1947 until August 1992, General Motors operated an automobile factory called Van Nuys Assembly at Van Nuys Boulevard and Arminta Street to augment production efforts at their South Gate Assembly factory, which opened in 1936. The Van Nuys plant manufactured 6.3 million vehicles, including the Chevrolet Impala, Corvair, and later was the primary location for the Nova, Camaro, and Pontiac Firebird. Other models built were the Chevrolet Monte Carlo, Chevelle, the Oldsmobile Omega, and the Pontiac Ventura. Badge engineered versions of the Impala, Nova and Camaro were also manufactured at this location. In October 1989, GM announced that Camaro and Firebird production would be moved to a facility in Sainte-Thérèse. Due to air quality remediation efforts and decreasing market share of GM products, the factory was closed.

In 1999, The Plant shopping center opened on the former factory site, anchored by a Home Depot, OfficeMax & 16-screen Mann movie theater multiplex. Through the following years there were additions to The Plant shopping center the following additions were: In-N-Out Burger, 7-Eleven, Gap Outlet, Ono Hawaiian BBQ, Starbucks, Party City, and Old Navy.
 
Sound City Studios is a well-respected recording studio in Van Nuys. Van Nuys, along with Chatsworth, is home to numerous pornographic film studios, distributors, and manufacturers.

Grupo TACA operates a Van Nuys-area TACA Center at 6710 Van Nuys Boulevard.

Various parts of the 1984 film The Terminator were filmed in Van Nuys.

Government services

The Los Angeles Fire Department operates Station 39 (Van Nuys), Station 90 Van Nuys Airport Area, Station 100 West Van Nuys, and Station 102 East Van Nuys, serving the community.

The Los Angeles Police Department operates the nearby Van Nuys Community Police Station at 6420 Sylmar Avenue, 91401, serving the neighborhood.

The United States Postal Service operates the Civic Center Van Nuys Post Office at 6200 Van Nuys Boulevard in Van Nuys (closed and moved outside the Van Nuys civic center to 6531 Van Nuys Blvd, Van Nuys, CA 91401) and the Van Nuys Post Office at 15701 Sherman Way in the Lake Balboa neighborhood in Los Angeles, west of Van Nuys.

The U.S. Census Bureau operates the Los Angeles Regional Office in Van Nuys.

The California Department of Developmental Services operates the North Los Angeles County Regional Center on Sherman Way west of Sepulveda Boulevard, but they closed that location and moved to a new location on Oakhurst and Plummer in Chatsworth in 2016. The agency serves a large population of developmentally disabled people living in the San Fernando Valley.

The Social Security Administration once operated a branch office on Van Nuys Boulevard north of Victory Boulevard in Van Nuys. This location was closed in 2011, and moved to Panorama City on Roscoe Blvd and Van Nuys Blvd.

Parks
The Van Nuys Recreation Area is in Van Nuys. The area has an auditorium and gymnasium with a capacity of 420 people, and a multipurpose/community room with a capacity of 20–25 people. The area has barbecue pits, lighted baseball diamonds, lighted outdoor basketball courts, a children's play area, a community room, lighted handball courts, an indoor gymnasium with no weights, picnic tables, a lighted soccer field, and lighted tennis courts.

Delano Park in Van Nuys has an auditorium, barbecue pits, a lighted baseball diamond, a children's play area, a lighted football field, an indoor gymnasium with no weights, picnic tables, and a lighted soccer field.

The Van Nuys adjacent Sepulveda Basin Recreation Area to the west is a large open space park behind Sepulveda Dam. The Metro Orange Line bicycle path connects Van Nuys to it and other valley destinations. It has numerous recreation facilities and natural areas, including a wildlife preserve, cricket complex, and archery range at Woodley Park.

The Van Nuys Sherman Oaks Park is in Sherman Oaks, near Van Nuys. The park has an auditorium, two lighted baseball diamonds, six unlighted baseball diamonds, lighted indoor basketball courts, lighted outdoor basketball courts, a children's play area, a 60-person community room, a lighted football field, an indoor gymnasium without weights, picnic tables, a lighted soccer field, and lighted tennis courts. Located in the same place as the park, the Van Nuys Sherman Oaks Pool is a seasonal outdoor heated swimming pool.
The Van Nuys Sherman Oaks Senior Citizen Center (a.k.a. Bernardi Center), also on the park grounds, has an auditorium and multi-purpose room. The senior community hall also has two community/meeting rooms, two kitchens, a play area, a shuffle board area, a stage, and two storage rooms.
The Van Nuys Sherman Oaks Tennis Courts facility in the Van Nuys Sherman Oaks Park has eight courts.

Education

Fifteen percent of Van Nuys residents aged 25 and older had earned a four-year degree by 2000, an average figure for both the city and the county, but the percentage of the same-age residents who had less than a high school diploma (43.1%) was high for Los Angeles.
 Brandon Boyd, vocalist of the multi-platinum rock band Incubus
 Bishop Joseph V. Brennan, Auxiliary Bishop of Los Angeles
 Steve Daines, U.S. senator from Montana
 Rose Marie, actress and comedienne
 Andy Devine, actor, honorary mayor from 1938 to 1957
 Don Drysdale, Hall of Fame baseball player
Kerry Lyn Dalton, murderer
Michael Erush (born 1984), soccer player and coach
 Mike Fetters, baseball pitcher and coach
 Laurence D. Fink, financier
 Brian Austin Green, actor
 Robert Harland, actor
 Chris Holdsworth, UFC fighter
 Michael Hunter, Professional boxer
 Michael Landau, musician
 Jon Locke, western television actor
 Gary Lockwood, actor
 Diane Warren, songwriter
 Delamere Francis McCloskey, Los Angeles City Council member, 1941–43
 Matthew Mercer, voice actor
 Ken Michelman, actor
 Matt Moore, professional football player
 Neal Morse, musician
 Tony Muser, Major League Baseball player and manager
Chris O'Loughlin (born 1967), Olympic fencer
 Johnny Parsons, Indy 500 Qualifier
 Miss Coco Peru, actor and drag performer
 Chris Pinnick, musician
 Sherri Rasmussen, murder victim 
 Robert Redford, actor, director, producer
 Jake Richardson, actor
 Shorty Rogers, jazz musician and arranger
 Jane Russell, actress
 Herbert Ryman, artist and Disney imagineer
 Nikki Sixx, musician
 Brody King, professional wrestler and musician
 Camryn Grimes, actress
 Bob Walk, baseball player and broadcaster
 Bob Waterfield, professional football player
 Brooke White, singer, American Idol Season 7 finalist 
 Hobart Johnstone Whitley, real-estate developer
 Cindy Williams, actress
 Natalie Wood, actress
 Todd Zeile, professional baseball player

Notable places
 Van Nuys Boulevard
Van Nuys City Hall
 Galpin Auto Sports — "Pimp My Ride" (seasons 5 and 6).
 Busch Gardens theme park (1964–1979), demolished.
 Sound City Studios

See also

 History of the San Fernando Valley

References

External links

 Van Nuys Profile - Mapping L.A. - Los Angeles Times
 
 Getty.edu: Van Nuys (neighborhood)
 

 
Communities in the San Fernando Valley
Neighborhoods in Los Angeles
1911 establishments in California
Populated places established in 1911